Leslie Victor Woodford (11 May 1897 – 23 May 1965) was an Australian rules footballer who played with Hawthorn in the Victorian Football League (VFL).

Family
The fourth of five children born to Thomas Edward Woodford (1864–1943) and Eveline Woodford (1867–1919), nee Holditch, Leslie Victor Woodford was born at Hawthorn on 11 May 1897.

In 1919 Les Woodford married Olive Susan Mould (1897–1928) and they had several children together. Following her death in 1928, Woodford married Martha McCullough (1907–1983) in 1930.

Football
Originally from Camberwell, Woodford played for Hawthorn in their inaugural VFL season in 1925. He was the first Hawthorn player to kick five goals in a game, doing so in their round three loss to Collingwood. By the end of the year he had kicked 20 goals, which was enough to top their goal-kicking.

The next season, he returned to Camberwell.

Honours and achievements 
Individual
 Hawthorn leading goalkicker: 1925

Death
Les Woodford died at Camberwell in May 1965 and is buried at Burwood Cemetery.

References

1897 births
Australian rules footballers from Melbourne
Hawthorn Football Club players
Camberwell Football Club players
1963 deaths
People from Hawthorn, Victoria